Chicago Ridge School District 127½ is a school district headquartered in the Dr. Bernard Jumbeck Administrative Center in Chicago Ridge, Illinois.

Most of Chicago Ridge and a portion of Oak Lawn are in the district boundaries. It operates three schools:  Finley Junior High School, Ridge Central School (elementary), and Ridge Lawn School (elementary). Community High School District 218 covers areas covered by this school district, and therefore the feeder high school is Harold L. Richards High School.

History
Finley Jr. High School opened in 1970.  The superintendent was Elden Finley.

A strike occurred in 2005.

Student body
In 2005 it had about 1,300 students.  it has about 1,550 students.

References

External links
 Chicago Ridge School District 127½

School districts in Cook County, Illinois
Oak Lawn, Illinois